The United States Senate Committee on Foreign Relations is a standing committee of the U.S. Senate charged with leading foreign-policy legislation and debate in the Senate. It is generally responsible for authorizing and overseeing foreign aid programs; arms sales and training for national allies; and holding confirmation hearings for high-level positions in the Department of State. Its sister committee in the House of Representatives is the Committee on Foreign Affairs.

Along with the Finance and Judiciary committees, the Foreign Relations Committee is among the oldest in the Senate, dating to the initial creation of committees in 1816. It has played a leading role in several important treaties and foreign policy initiatives throughout U.S. history, including the Alaska purchase, the establishment of the United Nations, and the passage of the Marshall Plan. The committee has also produced eight U.S. presidents—Andrew Jackson, James Buchanan, Andrew Johnson, Benjamin Harrison, Warren Harding, John F. Kennedy, Barack Obama, and Joe Biden—and 19 secretaries of state. Notable members have included Arthur Vandenberg, Henry Cabot Lodge, and William Fulbright.

The Foreign Relations Committee is considered one of the most powerful and prestigious in the Senate, due to its long history, broad influence on U.S. foreign policy, jurisdiction over all diplomatic nominations, and its being the only Senate committee to deliberate and report treaties.

Since 2021, the Foreign Relations Committee has been chaired by Democratic Senator Bob Menendez of New Jersey.

Role
In 1943, a confidential analysis of the Senate Foreign Relations Committee by British scholar Isaiah Berlin for the Foreign Office stated:

History

Between 1887 and 1907, Alabama Democrat John Tyler Morgan played a leading role on the committee. Morgan called for a canal linking the Atlantic and Pacific oceans through Nicaragua, enlarging the merchant marine and the Navy, and acquiring Hawaii, Puerto Rico, the Philippines and Cuba. He expected Latin American and Asian markets would become a new export market for Alabama's cotton, coal, iron, and timber. The canal would make trade with the Pacific much more feasible, and an enlarged military would protect that new trade. By 1905, most of his dreams had become reality, with the canal passing through Panama instead of Nicaragua.

During World War II, the committee took the lead in rejecting traditional isolationism and designing a new internationalist foreign policy based on the assumption that the United Nations would be a much more effective force than the old discredited League of Nations. Of special concern was the insistence that Congress play a central role in postwar foreign policy, as opposed to its ignorance of the main decisions made during the war. Republican senator Arthur Vandenberg played the central role.

In 1966, as tensions over the Vietnam War escalated, the committee set up hearings on possible relations with Communist China. Witnesses, especially academic specialists on East Asia, suggested to the American public that it was time to adopt a new policy of containment without isolation. The hearings Indicated that American public opinion toward China had moved away from hostility and toward cooperation. The hearings had a long-term impact when Richard Nixon became president, discarded containment, and began a policy of détente with China. The problem remained of how to deal simultaneously with the Chinese government on Taiwan after formal recognition was accorded to the Beijing government. The committee drafted the Taiwan Relations Act (US, 1979) which enabled the United States both to maintain friendly relations with Taiwan and to develop fresh relations with China.

In response to conservative criticism that the state department lacked hardliners, President Ronald Reagan in 1981 nominated Ernest W. Lefever as Assistant Secretary of State. Lefever performed poorly at his confirmation hearings and the Senate Committee on Foreign Relations rejected his nomination by vote of 4–13, prompting Lefever to withdraw his name. Elliot Abrams filled the position.

Republican senator Jesse Helms, a staunch conservative, was committee chairman in the late 1990s. He pushed for reform of the UN by blocking payment of U.S. membership dues.

Members, 118th Congress

Chairmen (1816–present)

Historical committee rosters

117th Congress

Subcommittees

116th Congress

115th Congress

114th Congress

Sources: –297, 661–662

113th Congress

Sources: –297, 661–662

See also
List of current United States Senate committees

Notes

References

Further reading
 Carter, Ralph G. and James Scott, eds. Choosing to Lead : Understanding Congressional Foreign Policy Entrepreneurs (Duke University Press, 2009)
 Crabb, Cecil Van Meter, and Pat M. Holt. Invitation to struggle: Congress, the president, and foreign policy (CQ Press, 1992)
 Dahl, Robert A. Congress and Foreign Policy (1950)
 Farnsworth, David Nelson. The Senate Committee on Foreign Relations (University of Illinois Press, 1961), a topical survey of the committee's activity from 1947 to 1956.
  Frye, Alton. "'Gobble'uns' and foreign policy: a review," Journal of Conflict Resolution (1964) 8#3 pp: 314–321. Historiographical review of major books
 Gagnon, Frédérick. "Dynamic Men: Vandenberg, Fulbright, Helms and the Activity of the Chairman of the US Senate Foreign Relations Committee Since 1945." online (2013)
 Gazell, James A. "Arthur H. Vandenberg, Internationalism, and the United Nations." Political Science Quarterly (1973): 375–394. in JSTOR
 Gould, Lewis. The Most Exclusive Club : A History of the Modern United States Senate (2006)
 Hewes, James E. Jr. "Henry Cabot Lodge and the League of Nations". Proceedings of the American Philosophical Society (1970) 114#4 pp: 245–255.
Hitchens, Harold L., "Influences of the Congressional Decision to Pass the Marshall Plan" Western Political Science Quarterly (1968) 21#1 pp: 51–68. in JSTOR
 Jewell, Malcolm E. Senatorial Politics and Foreign Policy (U. of Kentucky Press, 1962)
 Kaplan, Lawrence S. The Conversion of Senator Arthur H. Vandenberg: From Isolation to International Engagement (University Press of Kentucky, 2015)
 Link, William A.  Righteous Warrior: Jesse Helms and the Rise of Modern Conservatism (2008)
 McCormick, James M. "Decision making in the foreign affairs and foreign relations committees." in Randall B. Ripley and James M. Lindsay, eds.. Congress resurgent: foreign and defense policy on Capitol Hill (University of Michigan press, 1993)  pp: 115-153
 Maguire, Lori. "The US Congress and the politics of Afghanistan: an analysis of the Senate Foreign Relations and Armed Services Committees during George W Bush's second term." Cambridge Review of International Affairs (2013) 26#2 pp: 430–452.
 
 Robinson, James A. Congress and Foreign Policy-Making (1962), statistical study of roll calls emphasizing the importance of the committee 
 Spanier, John, and Joseph Nogee, eds. Congress, the Presidency and American Foreign Policy (Elsevier, 2013)
 Warburg, Gerald Felix. Conflict and consensus: The struggle between Congress and the president over foreign policymaking (HarperCollins Publishers, 1989)
 Woods, Randall Bennett. Fulbright : A Biography (Cambridge University Press, 1995)
 Young, Roland. Congressional Politics in the Second World War (1958), pp 168–96

Primary sources
 Vandenberg, Arthur Hendrick, and Joe Alex Morris, eds. The private papers of Senator Vandenberg. (1952)

External links

U.S. Senate Committee of Foreign Relations Official Website (Archive)
Senate Foreign Relations Committee. Legislation activity and reports, Congress.gov.
U.S. Government Printing Office (GPO) Page for the Committee of Foreign Relations

Foreign Relations
Foreign relations of the United States
1816 establishments in Washington, D.C.
United States diplomacy
Parliamentary committees on Foreign Affairs